The Negeri Sembilan State Legislative Assembly is the state legislature of the Malaysian state of Negeri Sembilan. It consists of 36 members who represent single-member constituencies throughout the state. Elections are held no more than five years apart, and are usually conducted simultaneously with elections to the federal parliament and other state assemblies (except Sarawak). It is unicameral.

The Assembly convenes at the Wisma Negeri in the state capital, Seremban.

Current composition

Seating arrangement

Role
The Negeri Sembilan State Legislative Assembly's main function is to enact laws that apply in the state. The Speaker presides over proceedings in the Assembly.

The Yang di-Pertuan Besar of Negeri Sembilan, as head of state, opens each session of the State Assembly. During the first sitting of each legislative session, he is joined by the four Undangs of Negeri Sembilan and the Tunku Besar of Tampin, the very people who elected him.

The leader of the majority party of coalition in the Assembly assumes the role of Menteri Besar. He appoints members of the State Executive Council, the executive branch of the Negeri Sembilan government.

Election pendulum 
The 14th General Election witnessed 20 governmental seats and 16 non-governmental seats filled the Negeri Sembilan State Legislative Assembly. The government side has 11 safe seats and 1 fairly safe seat, while the non-government side has 3 safe seats and 3 fairly safe seats. In addition, there were 1 seat that win uncontested in non-governmental seats; namely Rantau (won by incumbent assemblyman, Mohamad Hasan).

List of Assemblies

References

External links
 Negeri Sembilan State Government official website

 
Unicameral legislatures
State legislatures of Malaysia
Politics of Negeri Sembilan